Sir Samuel Bagster Boulton, 1st Baronet  (1830 – April 27, 1918) was the first baronet of Copped Hall, a Knight of Grace of the Order of St John of Jerusalem in England, Lord of the Manor of Totteridge, Justice of the Peace, and Deputy Lieutenant of Hertfordshire.

Career
In 1848, he founded a timber-merchants and contractor business with H. P. Burt. The company was a success and developed into the firm of Burt, Boulton and Haywood, Limited, formerly of London, Paris, Selzaete, Bilbao and Riga, which continues to this day. Boulton became the chairman of the expanded firm and was also the chairman of the Dominion Tar and Chemical Company (Limited), and of the British Australian Timber Company (Limited).

Boulton was a keen promoter of scientific method in the chemical and allied industries and contributed to the literature on the subject. In 1884 he was awarded the Telford Medal by the Institution of Civil Engineers. In later life he also sat on various boards concerned with the improvement of commerce: he was Chairman of the London Labour Conciliation and Arbitration Board from 1889 to 1913,  Vice-President of the London Chamber of Commerce from 1893 to 1898 and President of the West Ham Chamber of Commerce from 1893 to 1902. In 1905, in recognition of his achievements and contributions to British commerce and industry, he was created a baronet.

Family
Sir Samuel married Sophia Louisa, the daughter of Thomas Cooper, and had two sons and five daughters. His daughter Mabel was the well-known field-hospital commander and author Mrs.St Clair Stobart. Sir Samuel Boulton died in 1918 and was succeeded in the baronetcy by his son Harold. Sir Samuel was buried in the Boulton family vault in Brookwood Cemetery and is also commemorated with a plaque in his own local church: St Andrew's, Totteridge.

References

External links
 

1830 births
1918 deaths
Baronets in the Baronetage of the United Kingdom
Samuel
Totteridge
Knights of the Order of St John
St Andrew's church, Totteridge
Deputy Lieutenants of Hertfordshire
English justices of the peace
Lords of the Manor of Totteridge
Fellows of the Royal Geographical Society
Burials at Brookwood Cemetery